Yeast fatty acid synthase may refer to:
 Fatty acid synthase
 Fatty-acyl-CoA synthase